Sabbio Chiese is a comune in the province of Brescia, in Lombardy. It is located on the river Chiese, roughly midway from the Lake Garda and the Lake Idro.

Main sights
Rocca (Castle)
The small church of St. Peter

References

Cities and towns in Lombardy